James Ramsey may refer to:
 James Ramsey (politician) (1864–1939), provincial politician and businessman from Alberta, Canada
 James B. Ramsey (born 1937), Canadian econometrician
 James E. Ramsey (1931–2013), American politician and lawyer
 James R. Ramsey (born 1948), president of the University of Louisville (2002–2016)
 James Ramsey (baseball) (born 1989), American baseball player

See also
 James Ramsay (disambiguation)